Raido is an Estonian-language male given name.

People named Raido include:
 Raido Kodanipork (born 1969), Estonian cyclist
 Raido Ränkel (born 1990), Estonian cross-country skier 
 Raido Rüütel (born 1951), Estonian racing driver
 Raido Villers (born 1982), Estonian basketball player

References

Estonian masculine given names